Donald Hill–Eley is an American football coach and former player. He is currently the running backs coach at Georgia Tech, being promoted mid-season after serving as an offensive analyst for the first half of the season. He was previously the head football coach at Alabama State University. A graduate of Virginia Union University, Hill-Eley's coaching career has spanned three decades, includes stints in the Canadian Football League (CFL) and as head football coach at Morgan State University from 2002 to 2013.

Head coaching record

Notes

References

External links
 Georgia Tech profile
 Alabama State profile

Year of birth missing (living people)
Living people
Alabama State Hornets football coaches
Baltimore Stallions coaches
Georgia Tech Yellow Jackets football coaches
Hampton Pirates football coaches
Morgan State Bears football coaches
Norfolk State Spartans football coaches
Toronto Argonauts coaches
Virginia Union Panthers football coaches
Virginia Union Panthers football players
African-American coaches of American football
African-American players of American football
20th-century African-American sportspeople
21st-century African-American sportspeople